Mount Nutt Wilderness is a protected wilderness area in the central part of the Black Mountains in the U.S. state of Arizona.  It was established in 1990 under the Arizona Desert Wilderness Act, and it is managed by the Bureau of Land Management. This desert wilderness sits among a maze of desert canyons and steep mesas, surrounded by volcanic plugs.

Mount Nutt, the namesake for the wilderness, rises to an elevation of 5,216 feet (1589 m).  Vegetation in the area includes cottonwoods, willows, and oak, sustained by several springs, that also support a small population of desert bighorn sheep.

See also
 List of Arizona Wilderness Areas
 List of U.S. Wilderness Areas

References

IUCN Category Ib
Wilderness areas of Arizona
Protected areas of Mohave County, Arizona
Protected areas established in 1990
1990 establishments in Arizona